

Year 296 (CCXCVI) was a leap year starting on Wednesday (link will display the full calendar) of the Julian calendar. In the Roman Empire, it was known as the Year of the Consulship of Diocletian and Constantius (or, less frequently, year 1049 Ab urbe condita). The denomination 296 for this year has been used since the early medieval period, when the Anno Domini calendar era became the prevalent method in Europe for naming years.

Events 
 By place 
 Roman Empire 
 In this or the previous year, Caesar Constantius I assembles two invasion fleets with the intent of overthrowing the usurper Allectus, who is based in Britain. The first is under the command of Asclepiodotus, Maximian's long-serving Praetorian Prefect. Asclepiodotus sails from the mouth of the Seine, and lands near the Isle of Wight, where his forces defeat Allectus in Hampshire. Allectus is killed in the fighting. Constantius leaves Boulogne with his fleet, and occupies London, where he slaughters some of Allectus' Frankish mercenaries. With this victory, the Romano-British regime first established by Carausius is overthrown, and Britain is re-incorporated into the rest of the empire.
 Having supervised the Rhine frontier during Constantius' invasion of Britain, Maximian then marches into Spain, where he fights Frankish pirates. He then crosses into North Africa to contend with the rebellion of the Quinquegentiani.
 The Persian king Narseh invades Roman-held Upper Mesopotamia and Arsacid western Armenia, the latter territory being under the leadership of the pro-Roman king Tiridates III. With only a small army, Caesar Galerius fights three holding actions against Narseh's army in Mesopotamia. Somewhere in the open plains between Carrhae and Callinicum, Galerius' army suffers a defeat against the Persian army, which is both more numerous and contains superior numbers of high-quality cavalry. Nevertheless, Galerius succeeds in blunting the Persian offensive.

 By topic 
 Religion 
 April 22 – Pope Caius dies after a 13-year reign and is succeeded by Marcellinus as the 29th pope of Rome.

Births 
 Yu Bing (or Jijian), Chinese politician (d. 344)

Deaths 
 April 22 – Caius, bishop of Rome 
 Allectus, Roman treasurer and usurper-emperor 
 Guo Huai (or Yuhuang), Chinese noblewoman (b. 237)

References